An obstacle course is a series of challenging physical obstacles an individual, team or animal must navigate, usually while being timed. Obstacle courses can include running, climbing, jumping, crawling, swimming, and balancing elements with the aim of testing speed, endurance and agility. Sometimes a course involves mental tests. The idea has been adapted into TV shows (as in American Ninja Warrior and Wipeout (2008 game show) ) and video games (as in Fall Guys, Marvel's Spider-Man: Miles Morales, and to some extent Super Mario Bros.)

Types of courses

Military
The military/Army obstacle course is used (mostly in recruit training) as a way to familiarize recruits with the kind of tactical movement they will use in combat, as well as for physical training, building teamwork, and evaluating problem solving skills. Typical courses involve obstacles the participants must climb over, crawl under, balance, hang, jump, etc. Puddles of muddy water, ropes/nets, and "no touch" restrictions are often used to make the course more difficult. Often, specialized courses are made to focus on specific needs, such as night movement, assault, and bayonet training. Military courses can also contain climbing walls and rappelling walls.

At the Royal Military College of Canada in Kingston, Ontario, officer cadets in first year participate in an obstacle course, which is designed by senior cadets. The obstacle course lasts a little over an hour and consists of thirteen obstacles built by each squadron located around the RMC grounds. Obstacles such as a  wall and truck pulling are designed to test teamwork and physical fitness of First Years. The First Year flights are judged on the time it takes to complete each obstacle. The annual obstacle course race is memorialized by a sculpture by John Boxtel, "To Overcome", which was a gift of the class of 1991. Officer Cadets in third year take a physical education courses Obstacle Course and Water Borne Training. In the Obstacle course, cadets design obstacles with the available equipment and are evaluated on their leadership and innovation in the design of an obstacle course for their classmates. In the WB training, cadets learn about aquatic obstacle courses training and improve their basic swimming skills. 

At the United States Military Academy at West Point, NY, Cadets must take and pass the Indoor Obstacle Course Test (IOCT). The test consists of 11 obstacles that must be navigated sequentially and is a vigorous test of total body fitness and high intensity cardio-vascular capacity. First year Cadets take the IOCT as part of mandatory gymnastics training, while Third Year Cadets must pass the IOCT as a stand-alone test of fitness.

Inflatable
Inflatable (air filled) obstacle courses can have participants go through a variety of areas like the Bish Bash, a tall loose structure to push or wade through, nets to crawl under, walls to climb over and holes to jump through. Some larger inflatables have even more areas.

Assault
An assault obstacle course can be done inside or outside. The outside course is usually messy and filled with mud and muddy water. An inside course is similar to an inflatable course, but it is used in physical education lessons or holiday camps, using gym equipment or whatever is at hand.

Commercial 
Several indoor commercial indoor recreation and trampoline park companies have begun to include obstacle courses at their facilities, in many cases because of demand generated by television shows such as American Ninja Warrior, according to The Wall Street Journal.

Popular culture

 Rugged Maniac, a 5K obstacle course racing company, was featured on season 5 of Shark Tank on ABC. The owners received $1.75 million from Mark Cuban to invest into their company.
 Both the original Superstars and the American version featured an obstacle course, usually featured as the final event.
 Battle of the Network Stars featured an obstacle course as one of its many events.
 Survivor makes extensive use of obstacle courses for its challenges.
 Gladiators had an indoor obstacle course called "The Eliminator" at the end of each episode.
 The Peruvian children's series Nubeluz featured a mini–obstacle course called "El Circuito Glufico" as one of its many games in rotation.
 Viking: The Ultimate Obstacle Course is a Japanese endurance game show.
 Takeshi's Castle has obstacle courses in some rounds.
 Show jumping is an obstacle course for horse riding.
 Nickelodeon's Double Dares bonus round is an obstacle course.
 Sasuke, also known outside Japan as Ninja Warrior, is a Japanese obstacle course show aired on G4.
 On an episode of Total Drama Island, the campers build bikes and then use them to compete in an obstacle course.
 The Nickelodeon TV show GUTS used obstacle courses for most of its challenges, including the final, the Aggro Crag.
 The Disney Channel Games and Disney's Friends for Change Games use obstacle courses often to determine the winner of their weekly competitions.
 The game shows Wipeout on ABC and Total Wipeout on BBC One both revolve around the objective of completing obstacle courses.
 The Physical Ability round in The Krypton Factor involves the constants completing an obstacle course. It is often referred to as one of the most memorable memorials of the show. For the original series, the obstacle course was a real army assault course in Bury.
 The Canadian show Splatalot on YTV consists of a medieval-themed obstacle course teens must complete to capture a crown as their objective.
 Steve Austin's Broken Skull Challenge, a competition reality show, features an obstacle course known as the Skullbuster as its final event.
 Platform video games usually center around navigating environments taking the form of obstacle courses. In Roblox, a shorter name obby is used for such a game.
 OCR Kings, YouTube influencers helping others to succeed in Obstacle Course Racing.
 Spartan Race, the world's leading obstacle race company with more than 1 million global participants and more than 120 events in 20+ countries.

See also
 Aerial adventure park
 Assault course
 Obstacle Course Racing
 Dog agility
 Georges Hébert (1875–1957)
 Outdoor gym
 Obstacle racing
 Parkour
 Platform video game
 Ropes course
 Steeplechase (athletics)

References

External links 
 

Alternative education
Obstacle Course